Whitmore is an unincorporated community in Shasta County, California. Its population is 311 as of the 2020 census. Its zip code is 96096, and wired telephone numbers follow the pattern 530-472-xxxx, which is shared by the neighboring communities of Oak Run and Ingot.  There is one store and gas station, as well as a consignment/antique shop known as The Way Station. The store is next to the Whitmore post office. There are two churches, Whitmore Grace Community Church, and the Whitmore Seventh-Day Advent.

Politics
In the state legislature Whitmore is in the 4th Senate District, represented by Republican Doug LaMalfa, and in the 2nd Assembly District, represented by Republican Jim Nielsen.

Climate
This region experiences hot and dry summers,.  According to the Köppen Climate Classification system, Whitmore has a warm-summer Mediterranean climate, abbreviated "Csb" on climate maps.

Famous Residents
Vida Blue used to own ranch land in Whitmore.

References

Unincorporated communities in California
Unincorporated communities in Shasta County, California